Natsumi Asano (born 14 April 1997) is a Japanese professional footballer who plays as a goalkeeper for WE League club Chifure AS Elfen Saitama.

Club career 
Asano made her WE League debut on 2 October 2021.

References 

Living people
1997 births
Women's association football goalkeepers
Japanese women's footballers
Chifure AS Elfen Saitama players
WE League players
Association football people from Kanagawa Prefecture